

Competition history

FIBA U-18 Women's Asian Championship
  2022 (Div B) qualified

3x3 world cup
  2022 qualified

Tournament record

World Cup

The Mongolia women's national under-18 basketball team is administered by the Mongolian Basketball Association.
It represents the country in international under-18 (under age 18) women's basketball competitions.

Head coaches
 G. Undrakh
 B. Altanzaya
 B. Deleg

Scores

2022 FIBA Asia Under-18 Championship for Women

semifinals

Final

2022 FIBA 3x3 World Cup

See also
Mongolia women's national basketball team
Mongolia men's national under-18 basketball team

References

External links
 Archived records of Mongolia team participations

under
Women's national under-18 basketball teams